Sandra Moore Faber (born December 28, 1944) is an American astrophysicist known for her research on the evolution of galaxies. She is the University Professor of Astronomy and Astrophysics at the University of California, Santa Cruz, and works at the Lick Observatory. She has made discoveries linking the brightness of galaxies to the speed of stars within them and was the co-discoverer of the Faber–Jackson relation. Faber was also instrumental in designing the Keck telescopes in Hawaii.

Early life and education
Faber studied at Swarthmore College, majoring in Physics and minoring in Mathematics and Astronomy. She earned her bachelor's degree in 1966.  She then earned her PhD in 1972 from Harvard University, specializing in Optical Observational Astronomy under the direction of I. John Danziger. During this time the only observatory open to her was the Kitt Peak National Observatory, which had inadequate technology for the complexity of her thesis.

Personal life
Faber married Andrew Leigh Faber, a fellow Swarthmore physics major one year her junior, on June 9, 1967. They have two daughters, Robin and Holly.

Career and research
In 1972, Faber joined the faculty of the Lick Observatory at University of California, Santa Cruz, becoming the first woman on staff. In 1976, Faber observed the relationship between the brightness and spectra of galaxies and the orbital speeds and motions of the stars within them. The law that resulted would become known as the Faber–Jackson relation, after herself and the co-author, graduate student Robert Jackson.

Three years later, Faber and collaborator John S. Gallagher published a paper collecting all of the evidence for the existence of dark matter that had been published at that point. In 1983, she published original research showing that dark matter was not composed of fast-moving neutrinos ("hot dark matter") and that instead, it was likely composed of slow-moving particles yet to be discovered ("cold dark matter").

Around 1984, Faber collaborated with Joel Primack, George Blumenthal, and Martin Rees to elucidate their theory of how dark matter was part of galaxy formation and evolution. This was the first proposal of how galaxies have formed and evolved from the Big Bang to today. While some details have been proven wrong, the paper still stands as the current working paradigm for structure information in the universe. She and her collaborators discovered high-speed galaxy flows.

In 1985, Faber was involved with the construction of the Keck Telescope and building the first wide-field planetary camera for the Hubble Space Telescope.  UC Berkeley physicist Jerry Nelson designed the Keck telescope, but Faber helped to sell the idea of large optical telescopes all over the world.  The Keck telescope is the second largest optical telescope in the world, with a 10-meter primary mirror of a novel type that consists of 36 hexagonal segments.
Sandra Faber co-chaired the Science Steering Committee, which oversaw the first-light instrument for Keck I.  She also continued to insist on high optical quality for the primary mirror of the Keck I, and went on to work on the Keck II as well.

During the later 1980s, Faber got involved in an eight-year project called the "Seven Samurai" collaboration, which attempted to catalogue the size and orbital speeds of 400 galaxies. Though this goal was not met, the group developed a way to estimate the distance to any galaxy, which became one of the most reliable ways to measure the total density of the universe.

In 1990, she assisted with the on-orbit commissioning of the wide field planetary camera for the Hubble Space Telescope.  She says this was one of the most exhilarating and well-known phases of her career.  The optics of the Hubble were flawed, and Faber and her team helped to diagnose the cause as spherical aberration. In 1995, Faber was appointed University Professor at UCSC.

Faber was also the principal investigator of the Nuker Team, which used the Hubble Space Telescope to search for supermassive black holes at the centers of galaxies.  One of her most recent works include the addition of a new optical spectrograph for the Keck II telescope, which saw its first light in 1996.  The new addition would increase the Keck II's power for observing far-away galaxies by 13-fold.  She has also joined up with other scientists to create the CANDELS project, which is the largest survey of the universe taken by the Hubble Telescope.

At UCSC she focuses her research on the evolution of structure in the universe and the evolution and formation of galaxies. In addition to this, she led the development of the DEIMOS instrument on the Keck telescopes to obtain spectra of cosmologically distant galaxies. On August 1, 2012 she became the Interim Director of the University of California Observatories.

Sandra Faber was a co-editor of the Annual Review of Astronomy and Astrophysics with Ewine van Dishoeck from 2012–2021.

Honors and awards
 1977,  Alfred P. Sloan Foundation Fellowship
 1978, Bart J. Bok Prize, Harvard University
 1985. elected to the National Academy of Sciences
 1985, Dannie Heineman Prize for Astrophysics
 1986, Honorary Degree, Swarthmore College 
 1989, elected member, American Academy of Arts and Sciences
 1996-1997, Antoinette de Vaucouleurs Lectureship and Medal, University of Texas
 1997, Honorary Degree, Williams College
 2001, elected to the American Philosophical Society
 2005, Medaille de l'Institute d'Astrophysique de Paris
 2006, Harvard Centennial Medal
 2006, Member, Harvard Board of Overseers
 2006, Honorary Degree, University of Chicago
 2009, Bower Award and Prize for Achievement in Science, Franklin Institute
 2010, Honorary Degree, University of Pennsylvania
 2011, Honorary Degree, University of Michigan
 2011, Henry Norris Russell Lectureship, American Astronomical Society
 2012, Bruce Medal, Astronomical Society of the Pacific
 2012, Karl Schwarzschild Medal, German Astronomical Society
2012,  National Medal of Science
 2017, Gruber Prize in Cosmology
 2018, Magellanic Premium Medal, American Philosophical Society
 2020, Gold Medal of the Royal Astronomical Society
 2020, Elected a Legacy Fellow of the American Astronomical Society
 Member, Board of Trustees of the Carnegie Institution for Science
  Minor planet #283277 Faber is named for her.

See also
Faber–Jackson relation
Hubble Space Telescope
Nuker Team
List of women in leadership positions on astronomical instrumentation projects

References

Further reading

External links
 Inventory of the Sandra M. Faber Papers, Online Archive of California 
 Dr. Faber's page @ UCSC
 See video of Dr. Faber @ Meta-Library.net
 , from the Silicon Valley Astronomy Lectures
 Oral history interview transcript with Sandra M. Faber on 15 October 1955, American Institute of Physics, Niels Bohr Library & Archives
 Oral history interview transcript with Sandra M. Faber on 12 November 2020, American Institute of Physics, Niels Bohr Library & Archives
 Video of Faber talking about her work, from the National Science & Technology Medals Foundation

1944 births
Living people
American women astronomers
American cosmologists
Scientists from California
Fellows of the American Academy of Arts and Sciences
Members of the United States National Academy of Sciences
Harvard Graduate School of Arts and Sciences alumni
Lick Observatory
University of California, Santa Cruz faculty
Winners of the Dannie Heineman Prize for Astrophysics
20th-century American astronomers
21st-century American astronomers
20th-century American women scientists
21st-century American women scientists
Swarthmore College alumni
Members of the American Philosophical Society
Sloan Research Fellows
Recipients of the Gold Medal of the Royal Astronomical Society
Planetary scientists
Women planetary scientists
Fellows of the American Astronomical Society
Annual Reviews (publisher) editors